Blanche Adèle Moria (1859–1926) was a French sculptor, medallist, educator and feminist. A designer of busts, medals and monuments, she exhibited in various salons from 1883 and received many commissions from the State. As a feminist, Moria fought for women's rights, especially better access for women to education, jobs and politics. As a member of the Ligue Française pour le Droit des Femmes (French League for Women's Rights), in 1921 she contributed an article on women artists to the collection Cinquante ans de féminisme.

References

1859 births
1926 deaths
French feminists
19th-century French sculptors
20th-century French sculptors
French women sculptors
19th-century French artists
Artists from Paris
Académie Julian alumni
20th-century French women